The 2023 Open 13 Provence was a men's tennis tournament played on indoor hard courts. It was the 31st edition of the Open 13, and part of the ATP Tour 250 series of the 2023 ATP Tour. It took place at the Palais des Sports de Marseille in Marseille, France, from 20 through 26 February 2022.

Champions

Singles 

  Hubert Hurkacz def.  Benjamin Bonzi, 6–3, 7–6(7–4)

Doubles 

  Santiago González /  Édouard Roger-Vasselin def.  Nicolas Mahut /  Fabrice Martin, 4–6, 7–6(7–4), [10–7]

Points and prize money

Point distribution

Prize money 

*per team

Singles main-draw entrants

Seeds 

 Rankings are as of 13 February 2023.

Other entrants 
The following players received wildcards into the main draw:
  Geoffrey Blancaneaux
  Arthur Fils
  Luca Van Assche

The following players received entry from the qualifying draw:
  Gijs Brouwer 
  Lukáš Klein 
  Laurent Lokoli 
  Alexander Ritschard

Withdrawals 
  Pablo Carreño Busta → replaced by  Pablo Andújar
  Karen Khachanov → replaced by  Radu Albot
  Gaël Monfils → replaced by  Roman Safiullin
  Oscar Otte → replaced by  Elias Ymer
  Holger Rune → replaced by  Leandro Riedi
  Jannik Sinner

Doubles main-draw entrants

Seeds 

 1 Rankings are as of 13 February 2023.

Other entrants 
The following pairs received wildcards into the doubles main draw:
  Arthur Fils /  Luca Van Assche
  Luca Sanchez /  Petros Tsitsipas

The following pair received entry as alternates:
  Romain Arneodo /  Sam Weissborn

Withdrawals 
  Julian Cash /  Henry Patten → replaced by  Romain Arneodo /  Sam Weissborn 
  Jérémy Chardy /  Fabrice Martin → replaced by  Nicolas Mahut /  Fabrice Martin 
  Diego Hidalgo /  Hunter Reese → replaced by  Marco Bortolotti /  Sergio Martos Gornés
  Ugo Humbert /  Nicolas Mahut → replaced by  Andrew Harris /  John-Patrick Smith

References

External links 
Official website

Open 13 Provence
Open 13
2023 in French tennis
Open 13